The 1959 Tour de Suisse was the 23rd edition of the Tour de Suisse cycle race and was held from 12 June to 18 June 1959. The race started and finished in Zürich. The race was won by Hans Junkermann.

General classification

References

1959
Tour de Suisse